Alexander Carolus Curtius was a Lithuanian nobleman and scholar purported to be the first Lithuanian immigrant to The New World. He founded the first Latin school in New Amsterdam in 1659 and became its headmaster. Due to disciplinary problems and disputes over salary, he returned to Holland in 1661.

References 

Emigrants to New Netherland
17th-century Polish–Lithuanian Commonwealth people